Chiasmognathus is a genus of bees belonging to the family Apidae.

The species of this genus are found in Africa, Middle East, South Asia, and small range of Europe.

Species:

Chiasmognathus aegyptiacus 
Chiasmognathus aturksvenicus 
Chiasmognathus batelkai 
Chiasmognathus gussakovskii 
Chiasmognathus nearchus 
Chiasmognathus orientanus 
Chiasmognathus pashupati 
Chiasmognathus riftensis 
Chiasmognathus sabaicus 
Chiasmognathus saheliensis 
Chiasmognathus scythicus 
Chiasmognathus taprobanicola

References

Apidae
Hymenoptera genera